Carex flaccosperma, the blue wood sedge, is a species of flowering plant in the family Cyperaceae, native to the south-central and southeastern USA. Preferring to grow in wet, shady situations and deer resistant, it is recommended for shady areas in rain gardens.

References

flaccosperma
Flora of Kansas
Flora of Oklahoma
Flora of Texas
Flora of Missouri
Flora of the Southeastern United States
Plants described in 1846
Flora without expected TNC conservation status